Zlatolist, Blagoevgrad Province is a village in the municipality of Sandanski, in Blagoevgrad Province, Bulgaria.

Zlatolist Hill on Trinity Peninsula in Antarctica is named after the village.

References

Villages in Blagoevgrad Province